Unseen is a horror trilogy, written by Nancy Holder and Jeff Mariotte and published in 2001 by Pocket Books. It is part of the Buffy the Vampire Slayer series.

Volume 1: The Burning

The Unseen trilogy consists of three books authored by Nancy Holder and Jeff Mariotte. Tagline: "The first in a new crossover trilogy".

Plot summary
Salma de la Navidad, a friend of Willow's, is having problems: her brother Nicky has disappeared and is believed to be joining a local Sunnydale gang called the Latin Cobras. Salma's also got a black shadowy nothingness that Buffy can sense but can barely fight. Meanwhile, in LA, Angel is tied down by a case where his client is wrongfully accused of murder by crooked cops while Cordelia discovers a pack of pre-teens who revere vampires and have been promised eternal life by a vampire. Buffy's work takes her to LA along with Willow to the de la Navidad household where the same black shadow continues to attack Salma. When Salma suddenly disappears as does Kayley (one of the vampire lovers) everyone knows that something is up. After an explosion of oil fields, caused by Nicky, in Sunnydale, Riley rushes to LA where himself, Buffy and Angel have to work together to solve the disappearances and to calm down the gang warfare going on in LA.

Continuity
The tension established between Angel and Riley in "The Yoko Factor" continues.

Volume 2: Door To Alternity

Plot summary
In Los Angeles, Angel and Buffy compares notes and realize that both of them are dealing with cases of missing teenagers - most of them are children of the rich and powerful. Coincidence? They don't think so. But when Buffy checks in with Giles, she learns that prime time doomsday has hit Sunnydale, taking precedence over the gang warfare in LA.

Back in Sunnydale, Buffy finds the gateway through which the monsters are gaining all access passes to our universe. These gateways are controlled by renegade scientists who have discovered how to manipulate time and dimensional portals from one reality to the next, which could explain where the teens are hidden. But something goes wrong and nothing ever comes out of these gateways the same way that they went in. Now they come out bent and destroyed.

Alina is the only child that can control these portals but either she's lost her control or something in the Hellmouth is breaking these barriers. Buffy and Angel must go into the portal and see if they can salvage any of the children left on the inside.

Continuity
There is foreshadowing of Spike's approaching crush on Buffy.
Contains an uncanonical jailbreak of Faith.

Volume 3: Long Way Home

Plot summary
Buffy and Angel have travelled into the dimensional portals in order to find the missing kids. Unbeknownst to them, Spike took a running leap and dived in after them. They all end up on the same plane but it totally different areas: Angel locates a girl in a forest, Spike ends up in a vampire zoo and Buffy ends up fighting a dragon near an enchanted castle. Their job is to locate the 50 of so kids that have gone missing lately. Meanwhile, back on Earth, Gunn is helping Riley to bust Faith out of jail in order to send her to the alternate planes as well. In Sunnydale, Giles and Xander are trying their best to keep the monsters at a bare minimum level. Once Buffy and co., have located the missing children, the problem becomes how to get them back...

Characters
Buffyverse canon characters include: Buffy, Angel, Giles, Joyce, Xander, Anya, Willow, Cordelia, Spike, Tara, Riley and Wesley.

Continuity

Canonical issues

Buffyverse novels, such as this one are considered by most fans to not be part of Buffyverse canon. They are not considered as official Buffyverse reality, but are novels from the authors' imaginations. However unlike fanfic, 'overviews' summarising their story, written early in the writing process, were 'approved' by both Fox and Whedon (or his office), and the books were therefore later published as officially Buffy/Angel merchandise (see main article for further details).

Timing
Supposed to be set in the summer after "Restless" and "To Shanshu in L.A.". and before "Buffy vs. Dracula" and "Judgment". However, Xander recalls a conversation with Riley that happens in the third episode of season five.

External links

Reviews
Cityofangel.com - Interview with this author about this trilogy.

Book I
Litefoot1969.bravepages.com - Review of this book one by Litefoot
Teen-books.com - Reviews of Book I
Nika-summers.com - Review of book 1 by Nika Summers
Shadowcat.name - Review of book one

Book II
Litefoot1969.bravepages.com - Review of this book two by Litefoot
Teen-books.com - Reviews of Book II
Nika-summers.com - Review of book 2 by Nika Summers
Shadowcat.name - Review of book two

Book III
Litefoot1969.bravepages.com - Review of this book three by Litefoot
Teen-books.com - Reviews of Book III
Nika-summers.com - Review of book 3 by Nika Summers

Books based on Buffy the Vampire Slayer
Angel (1999 TV series) novels
Novels by Jeff Mariotte
Pocket Books books
2001 fantasy novels